A Measure Of Wealth is the debut studio album by Scottish indie rock band The Law, released on 28 September 2009 on Local Boy Records. The album also includes two early singles "Milk & Honey" and "Still Got Friday To Go".

Track listing

Personnel
 Stuart Purvey – vocals
 Stevie Anderson – guitar
 Simon Donald – bass
 Martin Donald – drums

References

2009 albums
The Law (Scottish band) albums